Great Britain competed at the  World Games 2017 in Wroclaw, Poland, from July 20 to July 30, 2017.

Medalists
The following competitors won medals at the Games for Great Britain:

Competitors

Gymnastic

Trampoline
Great Britain has qualified at the 2017 World Games:

Men's Individual Double Mini Trampoline - 1 quota 
Men's Individual Tumbling - 1 quota
Women's Individual Double Mini Trampoline - 1 quota
Women's Individual Tumbling - 1 quota

Korfball
Great Britain has qualified at the 2017 World Games in the Korfball Mixed Team event.

Lacrosse
Great Britain has qualified at the 2017 World Games in the Lacrosse Women event.

Kickboxing
Kickboxing - Is on the World Games for the first time as an invitational sport.
Only one GB Fighter has qualified during the European Championships in Slovenia 2016.
Division = K1, Female -52 kg Monika Markowska
from Jersey, UK.

Tug of war 

Great Britain won the gold medal in the men's outdoor 640 kg event and the bronze medal in the men's outdoor 700 kg event.

References 

Nations at the 2017 World Games
2017 in British sport
2017